Evil Live is a live album by British heavy metal band Diamond Head; it is the band's fifth recording, and a double CD. The main album was recorded live at the National Bowl in Milton Keynes, UK in 1993; the second CD "Evil Extras" features cover versions and previously unreleased tracks.

Track listing

Diamond Head (band) live albums
1994 live albums